The National Bolshevik Party (NBP), also known as the Nazbols, operated from 1993 to 2007 as a Russian political party with a political program of National Bolshevism. The NBP became a prominent member of The Other Russia coalition of opposition parties. Russian courts banned the organization and it never officially registered as a political party. In 2010, its leader Eduard Limonov founded a new political party, called The Other Russia. There have been smaller NBP groups in other countries.

Its official publication, the newspaper Limonka, derived its name from the party leader's surname and from the idiomatic Russian word for a grenade. The main editor of Limonka was for many years, Aleksey Volynets.

Ideology

Party platform 

The NBP believes in the National Bolshevik ideas that arose during the Russian Civil War, such as those from Professor Nikolai Ustryalov, who came to believe that Bolshevism could be modified to serve nationalistic purposes. His followers, the Smenovekhovtsy, who then came to regard themselves as National Bolsheviks, borrowed the term from Ernst Niekisch, who was a German politician initially associated with left-wing politics and later, the National Bolshevik ideology.

Limonov and Dugin sought to unite far-left and far-right radicals on the same platform, with Dugin viewing national Bolsheviks as a point between Communist ideas and Fascists. Dugin was forced to act in the peripheries of each group. In 1998, Dugin left the NBP and this led to the party moving further left in Russia's political spectrum.

The NBP has denied any links to fascism, stating that all forms of antisemitism, xenophobia and racism were against the party's principles.

The NBP has historically defended Stalinism, although later on the party said it did not wish to re-create that system.

The party is described as a mixture of far-left and far-right ideology, including among its members Sovietism' nostalgics as well as skinheads, with the hammer and sickle (which replace the swastika) in a white circle on a red background as party's flag.

On 29 November 2004, participants of the general congress of the NBP adopted a new party program. According to the program, "the main goal of the National Bolshevik Party is to change Russia into a modern, powerful state, respected by other countries and peoples and beloved by its own citizens" by ensuring the free development of civil society, the independence of the media and social justice.

The NBP was highly critical of President Vladimir Putin's government and argued that state institutions such as the bureaucracy, the police and the courts were corrupt and authoritarian.

Counterculture 

Since its formation, the National Bolshevik Party had relationships with Russian counterculture.

National Bolsheviks often used punk-stylized shock aesthetics in their propaganda. NBP attracted a significant number of artists, punk musicians and rock bands.

Criticism 
Some western critics commented on its heavy use of totalitarian and fascist symbols and its "national-patriotic demagoguery," and academics have described the group as neo-fascist.

In the Russian media, the National Bolshevik Party was usually referred to as a far-left youth movement; however, some critics (including ex-members) allege that the NBP is an organisation dedicated to carry out a colour revolution in Russia.

History

Origins (1993–1998) 

In 1992, Eduard Limonov founded the National Bolshevik Front (NBF) as an amalgamation of six minor groups. Aleksandr Dugin was among the earliest members and was instrumental in convincing Limonov to enter politics. The party first attracted attention in 1992 when two members were arrested for possessing grenades. The incident gave the NBP publicity for a boycott campaign they were organizing against Western goods. The NBF joined forces with the National Salvation Front (a broad coalition of Russian communists and nationalists).

The FNS was one of the leading groups involved in the 1993 Russian constitutional crisis, and Limonov participated in the clashes near the White House in Moscow on the side of the Anti-Yeltsin opposition.

When others within the coalition began to speak out against the NBF, it withdrew from the alliance.

On 1 May 1993, Limonov and Dugin signed a declaration of founding the NBP.

On 28 November 1994, Limonov founded the newspaper Limonka, the official organ of the NBP.

In 1998, Dugin left the NBP as a result of a conflict with other members of the party. This led to the party moving further left in Russia's political spectrum, and lead to members of the party denouncing Dugin and his group as fascists.

Arrest of Eduard Limonov (2001–2003) 
Limonov and some National Bolsheviks were jailed in April 2001 on charges of terrorism, the forced overthrow of the constitutional order, and the illegal purchase of weapons. Based on an article published in Limonka under Limonov's byline,  the government accused Limonov of planning to start an armed insurgency in Kazakhstan.

After the arrest of the leader, members of the party started activities (including direct action stunts) against Putin's government. In 2002, members of the NBP participated in a common demonstration of far-left forces in a Moscow a demonstration called Anticapitalism-2002. National Bolsheviks clashed with riot police.

In 2003, Limonov was released from Lefortovo Prison.

In opposition to the government (2004–2007) 

Since 2004, the NBP has formed alliances with other opposition forces, both far-left and right-wing. In 2004, Limonov signed the declaration titled "Russia without Putin."

In August 2006, an anti-Limonovist faction of the NBP that was right-wing formed the National Bolshevik Front.

The NBP became a prominent member of The Other Russia coalition of opposition parties.

In 2007, the NBP members took part in a Dissenters' March and other subsequent demonstrations against the government.

Outlawed and aftermath (2007–2010) 

The NBP was banned by a Russian lower court in June 2005, but the Russian Supreme Court overturned that ban on 16 August 2005. In November 2005, the Russian Supreme Court upheld a ban on the party on the grounds that the NBP called itself a political party without being registered as such.

On 7 August 2007, the Russian Supreme Court confirmed the decision of the Moscow City Court of 19 April to ban the party as an extremist organization.

In 2009, NBP members took part in Strategy-31, a series of civic protests in support of the right to peaceful assembly.

In July 2010, the National Bolsheviks founded a new political party, The Other Russia.

Direct actions 
The NBP often used non-violent direct-action stunts, mostly against prominent political figures.

Notable direct actions 
 On 24 August 1999, the NBP occupied a tower of the Club of Military Seamen in Sevastopol on Ukraine's Independence Day. Some of the operatives were sentenced to prison.
 During Prince Charles' tour of the Baltic states in 2001, a member of the Latvian branch of the NBP hit Charles' face with a flower in an act of protest against the War in Afghanistan.
 During the 2002 Prague summit, National Bolsheviks threw tomatoes at George Robertson to protest against the extension of NATO and American imperialism.
 On 3 March 2004, National Bolsheviks occupied the United Russia headquarters in Moscow and protested against government policy.
 On 22 June 2004, National Bolsheviks occupied Germany's Trade Embassy in Moscow on the anniversary of the German invasion of the Soviet Union. They hung a banner with an inscription "Never forget! Never forgive!"
 On 2 August 2004, a group of National Bolsheviks occupied the office of the Health and Social Development Ministry building in Moscow to protest against the social benefits reform. Police arrested most of the participants, and on 12 December 2004, seven National Bolsheviks were each sentenced to five years in prison.
 On 14 December 2004, NBP members occupied the presidential-administration visitors' room to protest against government policy. Police arrested thirty-nine National Bolsheviks, with many of them being sentenced to prison.
 On 25 September 2006, National Bolsheviks occupied the Ministries of Finances building in Moscow to protest against liberal economic policy.

International groups 
National Bolshevik Party founded branches across the Post-Soviet states. Relatively strong branches of the party existed in Latvia, Ukraine, and Belarus. Several small groups often made up of Russian immigrants that are named National Bolshevik Party have existed in countries across Europe and North America. Most of them did not have official registration.

Latvia 
Latvia's NBP has had members hold office in Riga and has executed notable publicity stunts, but it remains largely marginal there. The Latvian branch has been led by Vladimir Linderman and Aijo Beness.

In 2003, Linderman was accused of storing explosives and of calling for the overthrow of the political system. He left Latvia and moved to Russia.

In 2005, during the visit of George W. Bush in Latvia, local national Bolsheviks and the Vanguard of Red Youth organized meetings "against American imperialism". Police broke up a demonstration and arrested its participants. The Latvian NBP was also active in anti-capitalist demonstrations and in anti-Nazi blockades during Remembrance day of the Latvian legionnaires.

Ukraine 
The Ukrainian NBP was largely based in the east of the country. Initially, the NBP joined forces with another small parties and signed a "Declaration of the Kiev Council of Slav Radical Nationalists" together with Ukrainian nationalists. But later, Ukrainian national Bolsheviks were active in demonstrations against Ukrainian nationalists on  the anniversary of the founding of the Ukrainian Insurgent Army. National Bolsheviks also organized actions against the rapprochement with NATO. During the Orange Revolution, the Ukrainian NBP decided to not support any side. Since 2014, national Bolsheviks formed armed troop interbrigades and participated in the pro-Russian unrest in Donbass.

European Court of Human Rights decision
In September 2021, European Court of Human Rights found that there was a violation of Article 11 of the European Convention on Human Rights on account of the dissolution of the NBP association in 2004 and on account of the refusal to register the NBP political party, and awarded EUR 10,000 jointly to the children of Eduard Limonov and four of his followers.

Notable members

Current 
Until banning of the NBP in 2007
 Zakhar Prilepin
 Vladimir Linderman
 Aijo Beness
 Sergei Aksenov 
 Aleksandr Averin 
 Andrei Dmitriev 
 Sergei Fomchenkov
 Taisiya Osipova 
 Maxim Gromov

Former 
 Aleksandr Dugin
 Roman Konoplev

Deceased 
 Eduard Limonov
 Yegor Letov 
 Aleksandr Nepomniachtchi 
 Natalya Medvedeva 
 Aleksandr Dolmatov 
 Yuriy Chervochkin 
 Andrei Sukhorada 
 Sergey Kuryokhin

Media depictions

Films 
 Sud nad prizrakom (2002)
 Saratov (2002)
 Fuck off Mr. Bond! (2002)
 Da, smert (2004)
 Zuby drakona (2005)
 Les Enfants terribles de Vladimir Vladimirovitch Poutine (2006)
 The Revolution That Wasn't (2008)
 Utopie Russe (2014)

Books 
By Eduard Limonov
 Anatomy of a Hero (1997)
 My Political Biography (2002)
 Russian Psycho (2003)
 The Other Russia (2003)

By other authors
 Ultranormalnost (2005), a novel by Natan Dubovitskiy
 Generation of Limonka (2005), a collection of short stories by multiple young Russian authors 
 The Gospel of the Extremist (2005), a novel by Roman Konoplev
 Sankya (2006), a novel by Zakhar Prilepin
 The Way of the Hongweibin (2006), a novel by Dmitri Zhvaniya
 A Russian Diary: A Journalist's Final Account of Life, Corruption, and Death in Putin's Russia a book by Anna Politkovskaya
 Truth of the Trenches of the Chechen War (2007), a collection of articles by multiple Russian authors 
 12 Who Don't Agree (2009), a non-fiction book by Valery Panyushkin
 Girls of the Party (2011), a photo-album by Sergei Belyak
 Limonka to Prison (2012), a novel by NBP political prisoners
 Limonov (2011), a biographical novel by Emmanuel Carrère
Religion of the Furious (2013), a novel by Ekaterina Rysk

Other 
 Orda, a comic book by Igor Baranko

References

Bibliography 
 The Beast Reawakens (1997) by Martin A. Lee

External links 
 
 National Bolshevik Party – old website (archived)
 National Bolshevik Party website (archived)
 Nazbol – website of russian national-bolsheviks (archived)
 NBP-INFO – National Bolshevik blog
 Limonka
 Who Are the National-Bolsheviks? by Andrei Dmitriev
 An interview with national-bolshevik Beness Aijo
 Russia: National Bolsheviks, The Party Of 'Direct Action' from Radio Free Europe/Radio Liberty

1993 establishments in Russia
Banned communist parties
Banned far-right parties
Banned political parties in Russia
Counterculture of the 1990s
Defunct communist parties in Russia
Defunct nationalist parties in Russia
Direct action
Left-wing nationalist parties
Political parties established in 1993
Russian nationalist parties
Syncretic political movements
Neo-Sovietism
Far-left politics in Russia
Far-right political parties in Russia
Right-wing parties in Europe
Far-left political parties
Political parties disestablished in 2007
2007 disestablishments in Russia
Opposition to Vladimir Putin
Defunct far-right parties
National Bolshevik parties
Right-wing politics in Asia
European Court of Human Rights cases involving Russia
Article 11 of the European Convention on Human Rights
Eduard Limonov